Two ships of the Royal Navy have borne the name HMS Ceanothus. Ceanothus comes from the Greek word keanthos, meaning a type of thistle.

  was an  sloop launched in 1917. In 1921 she was transferred to the Royal Indian Marine and renamed HMINS Elphinstone. She was wrecked on 29 January 1925 off the Nicobar Islands. 
  was a modified  launched in 1943. She was transferred in the same year to the Royal Canadian Navy and renamed HMCS Forrest Hill. She was sold for scrap in 1948.

References
 

Royal Navy ship names